The Living Death is a 1915 American short drama film directed by Tod Browning.

Cast
 F. A. Turner as Dr. Farrell
 Billie West as Naida Farrell
 Edward Peil Sr. as Tom O Day (as Edward Peil)

References

External links

1915 films
1915 drama films
Silent American drama films
1915 short films
American silent short films
American black-and-white films
Films directed by Tod Browning
1910s American films
1910s English-language films